Lieutenant general (Lt Gen, LTG and similar) is a military rank used in many countries. The rank traces its origins to the Middle Ages, where the title of lieutenant general was held by the second-in-command on the battlefield, who was normally subordinate to a captain general.

In modern armies, lieutenant general normally ranks immediately below general (or colonel general) and above major general; it is equivalent to the navy rank of vice admiral, and in air forces with a separate rank structure, it is equivalent to air marshal. A lieutenant general commands an army corps, made up of typically three army divisions, and consisting of around 60,000 to 70,000 soldiers (U.S.).

The seeming incongruity that a lieutenant general outranks a major general (whereas a major outranks a lieutenant) is due to the derivation of major general from sergeant major general, which was a rank subordinate to lieutenant general (as a lieutenant outranks a sergeant major). Several countries (e.g. Balkan states) use the rank of lieutenant colonel general instead of lieutenant general, in an attempt to solve this apparent anomaly.

In contrast, in Russia and a number of other countries of the former Soviet Union, lieutenant general is a rank immediately below colonel general, and above major general – in these systems there is no use of the brigadier general of many Western countries.

In addition, some counties use the lieutenant general as the rank of divisional commander, and some have designated them with 
French revolutionary system. For example, some countries of South America use divisional general as the equivalent of lieutenant general.

Lieutenant general ranks by country

 Lieutenant general (Australia)
 Lieutenant general (Bangladesh)
 General-pukovnik (Bosnia & Herzegovina)
 Lieutenant-general (Canada) 
  (Finland)
  (Estonia)
  (Germany)
 Lieutenant General (India)
 Lieutenant general (Nigeria)
 Lieutenant general (Pakistan)
 Lieutenant general (Sri Lanka)
  (Sweden)
 Lieutenant general (United Kingdom)
 Lieutenant general (United States)

Army ranks

See also
 British and United States military ranks compared
 Comparative military ranks
 Israel Defense Forces ranks
 List of lieutenant generals in the United States Army before 1960

References

External links 
 

Military ranks
 
Military ranks of Singapore
Military ranks of the Nepali Army